Kaimoto (written: 海本) is a Japanese surname. Notable people with the surname include:

, Japanese footballer
, Japanese footballer

Japanese-language surnames